Not Three (French: Le pas de trois) is a 1964 French-Portuguese comedy film directed by Alain Bornet and starring Clara D'Ovar, Annie Fratellini and Jean-Loup Reynold.

Cast
 Clara D'Ovar as Duke's daughter  
 Annie Fratellini as Duke's waitress  
 Jean-Loup Reynold as Chantagista / Blackmailer  
 Costinha as Duke's servant  
 Madeleine Delavaivre as Duchess  
 Jean Tissier as Duke

References

Bibliography 
 José de Matos Cruz. Cinema português: o dia do século. Grifo, 1998.

External links 
 

1964 films
1964 drama films
Portuguese comedy films
French comedy films
1960s French-language films
1960s French films